Maftun (also Romanized as Māftūn) is a village in Kahrizak Rural District, Kahrizak District, Ray County, Tehran Province, Iran. At the 2006 census, its population was 155, in 36 families.

References 

Populated places in Ray County, Iran